Dulan County (Mongolian:;) is a county of east-central Qinghai province, China. It is under the administration of Haixi Mongol and Tibetan Autonomous Prefecture.

Climate
Average low temperatures are below freezing from early/mid October to mid/late April; however, due to the wide diurnal temperature variation, only December and January have an average high that is below freezing. With monthly percent possible sunshine ranging from 60% in July to 81% in November, the county seat is very sunny, receiving 3,092 hours of bright sunshine annually; relative humidity in all months is below 50% and is for seven months below 40%.

Administrative Divisions
Reshui Township

Transport
China National Highway 109

References

External links

County-level divisions of Qinghai
Haixi Mongol and Tibetan Autonomous Prefecture